Toon Time may refer to:

Toon Time (TV series)
Toon Time, DVD of Max Fleischer colour classics
Toon Time (album)